The Bäke  is a river of Berlin and Brandenburg, Germany.

The river has been moved largely into the Teltow Canal, which was constructed between 1900 and 1906.

See also
List of rivers of Brandenburg

External links

Rivers of Brandenburg
Rivers of Berlin
Rivers of Germany